John Arden (26 October 1930 – 28 March 2012) was an English  playwright who at his death was lauded as "one of the most significant British playwrights of the late 1950s and early 60s".

Career
Born in Barnsley, son of the manager of a glass factory, he was educated at Sedbergh School in Cumbria, King's College, Cambridge and the Edinburgh College of Art, where he studied architecture. He first gained critical attention for the radio play The Life of Man in 1956 shortly after finishing his studies.

Arden was initially associated with the English Stage Company at the Royal Court Theatre in London. His 1959 play, Serjeant Musgrave's Dance, in which four army deserters arrive in a northern mining town to exact retribution for an act of colonial violence, is considered to be his best. His work was influenced by Bertolt Brecht and Epic Theatre as in Left-Handed Liberty (1965, on the anniversary of Magna Carta). Other plays include Live Like Pigs, The Workhouse Donkey, and Armstrong's Last Goodnight, the last of which was performed at the 1965 Chichester Festival by the National Theatre after it was rejected by the Royal Court.

His 1978 radio play Pearl was considered in a Guardian survey to be one of the best plays in that medium. He also wrote several novels, including Silence Among the Weapons, which was shortlisted for the Booker Prize in 1982, and Books of Bale, about the Protestant apologist John Bale. He was a member of the Royal Society of Literature.

With his wife and co-writer Margaretta D'Arcy he picketed the RSC premiere of his Arthurian play The Island of the Mighty, because they thought the production was pro-imperialist, and they wrote several plays together which were highly critical of British presence in Ireland, where he and D'Arcy lived from 1971 onward.

In 1961, he was a founder member of the anti-nuclear Committee of 100, and he also chaired the pacifist weekly Peace News. In Ireland, he was for a while a member of Official Sinn Féin. He was an advocate of civil liberties, and opposed anti-terror legislation, as demonstrated in his 2007 radio play The Scam.

Last years and death
He was elected to Aosdána in 2011 before dying in Galway in 2012. He was waked in a wicker casket.

Awards
 Evening Standard Award, 1960
 John Whiting Award, 1973
 V. S. Pritchett Award, 2003
 Booker Prize shortlist, 1982
 Giles Cooper Award, 1978 and 1982

Works
(Selected)

Books
 
 
Arden, John, (2009), Gallows and other Tales of Suspicion and Obsession, Original Writing, Dublin,

Plays by John Arden
 Serjeant Musgrave's Dance: an Unhistorical Parable (1960)
 Live Like Pigs (1958)
 The workhouse donkey: a vulgar melodrama (1964)
 Armstrong's last goodnight (1965), based on the story of Johnnie Armstrong
 Ironhand: adapted by John Arden from Goethe's Goetz von Berlichingen (1965)
 Left-handed liberty (1965)
 Two autobiographical plays: the true history of Squire Jonathan and his unfortunate treasure, and The bagman, or the impromptu of Muswell Hill (1971)
 Pearl: a play about a play within the play (1979)
 Books of Bale (1988)
 Cogs tyrannic (1992)
 Jack Juggler and the emperor's whore: seven tall tales linked together for an indecorous toy theatre (1995)
 Stealing Steps (2003)

Plays written in collaboration with Margaretta D'Arcy include:
 The Happy Haven (1960)
 The Business of Good Government: a Christmas Play (1963)
 Ars Longa Vita Brevis (1965)
 The Royal Pardon (1967)
 The Hero Rises Up (1969)
 The Island of the Mighty trilogy (Part I, "Two Wild Young Noblemen: Concerning Balin and Balan and How Ignorant They Were"; Part II, "Oh the Cruel Winter: Concerning Arthur – Flow He Refused to See That the Power of His Army Was Finished"; and Part III, "A Handful of Watercress: Concerning Merlin – How He Needed to Be Alone and Then How He Needed Not to Be Alone") (1972)
 The Ballygombeen Bequest
 The Non-Stop Connolly Show: a dramatic cycle of continuous struggle in six parts (1977)
 Vandaleur's folly: an Anglo-Irish melodrama: the hazard of experiment in an Irish co-operative, Ralahine, 1831 (1981)
 The little gray home in the west: an Anglo-Irish melodrama (1982)
 Keep the People Moving (BBC Radio);
 Portrait of a Rebel (RTÉ Television);
 The Manchester Enthusiasts (BBC 1984 and RTÉ 1984 under the title The Ralahine Experiment);
 Whose is the Kingdom? (9 part radio play, BBC 1987).

See also
 List of winners and shortlisted authors of the Booker Prize for Fiction

References

External links
 Britain's Brecht – Guardian Article
 List of plays
 Survey of Arden's Radio plays
 doollee.com – The Playwright's Database 
 

1930 births
2012 deaths
Alumni of King's College, Cambridge
Alumni of the Edinburgh College of Art
Aosdána members
British expatriates in Ireland
British anti-war activists
British male dramatists and playwrights
British male novelists
Fellows of the Royal Society of Literature
People educated at Sedbergh School
People from Barnsley
20th-century British dramatists and playwrights
20th-century British novelists
20th-century British male writers
20th-century British writers